Atalantycha is a genus of soldier beetles in the family Cantharidae. There are at least four described species in Atalantycha.

Species
These four species belong to the genus Atalantycha:
 Atalantycha bilineata (Say, 1823) (two-lined cantharid)
 Atalantycha dentigera (LeConte, 1851)
 Atalantycha humata (Wickham, 1913)
 Atalantycha neglecta (Fall, 1919)

References

Further reading

External links

 

Cantharidae
Articles created by Qbugbot